Devil Survivor 2: The Animation is a 2013 supernatural anime series based on the Shin Megami Tensei: Devil Survivor 2 video game by Atlus. The story revolves around a mysterious calamity which plunges the world into a state of chaos. This causes Hibiki Kuze and his friends Daichi Shijima and Io Nitta to be suddenly thrown from their normal lives into a battle of survival against creatures called Septentriones which were sent by the alien entity known as Polaris to destroy the spiritual barriers protecting Japan from a recreation tool known as The Void. Gaining the ability to summon demons from a cell phone app, Hibiki and his friends team up with an organization known as the JP's to protect Japan and above all else—survive.

The anime adaptation is produced by Studio Bridge of Japan and directed by Seiji Kishi. In addition, series composition and script writing for all episodes were done by Makoto Uezu while the musical score was composed by Kotaro Nakagawa. Character designs are done by Etsushi Sajima, which are based on the original character designs by Suzuhito Yasuda, along with art direction by Kazuto Shimoyama and sound direction by Satoki Iida. The thirteen episode series premiered on MBS' Animeism programming block on April 4, 2013, and was later aired on TBS, CBC, BS-TBS and Niconico. The series was first acquired by Crunchyroll for online simulcast streaming in North America and other select locations across the world. It was later obtained by the Anime Network for streaming. Pony Canyon released the series on seven Blu-ray and DVD volumes between June 19 and December 18, 2013 in Japan. The anime was licensed by Sentai Filmworks in North America for home media distribution. Hanabee Entertainment later licensed the series for release in Australia and New Zealand. MVM Entertainment also obtained the series for distribution in the United Kingdom.

The episodes use three pieces of theme music: one opening theme, one closing themes and one insert song. The anime debuted with "Take Your Way" by Livetune feat. Fukase as the opening theme for all episodes except the ninth and tenth episodes. The first closing theme, "Be" by Song Riders is used for all episodes except the tenth. The insert song is "Each and All" by Livetune feat. Rin Oikawa and doubled as the closing theme for the tenth episode.

Episode list

Home media
Pony Canyon released the series in Japan on seven Blu-ray and DVD volumes between June 19 and December 18, 2013. The company later released the entire series on a Blu-ray box set in Japan on January 30, 2015. The complete series was released by Sentai Filmworks on DVD and Blu-ray format on July 1, 2014, and April 21, 2015 respectively. Hanabee Entertainment issued their releases on September 3, 2014 and May 6, 2015. MVM Entertainment released the series on DVD format on October 20, 2014. These releases contained English and Japanese audio options and English subtitles.

Notes

References

External links
 Official anime website 

Devil Survivor 2: The Animation
Megami Tensei episode lists